Wooster School is a private, co-educational, college-preparatory school (grades 5 through 12) in Danbury, Connecticut. It is a member of the Connecticut Association of Independent Schools.

Overview
The Wooster School motto is Ex Quoque Potestate, Cuique Pro Necessitate, roughly, "From each according to ability, to each according to need". Founded in 1926 as a boys' school of 10 students by Episcopal priest Dr. Aaron Coburn, it is named for General David Wooster, who fought at the Battle of Ridgefield with the Patriots in the American Revolution. The school continues the legacy of the jobs program, led by 12th-grade prefects, in which the entire student body engages in a daily period dedicated to cleaning and physically maintaining the campus.

Girls were first admitted to the school in the fall of 1970. In 1990, Wooster School transitioned from being a boarding school, as it had been since its inception, to being a day school. In 1991, a Lower School was established in addition to Wooster's Middle and Upper Schools, which now included grades 1 and 2, plus grades 3, 4, and 5 the following year.

21st-century changes
Since 2000, one of the National Association of Episcopal Schools' top two educator awards is named for former Wooster School head John D. Verdery.

From 2001 to 2004, Wooster School made some improvements to its physical plant, notably the addition of a new gymnasium and a distinct Middle School building.

In 2014, the school's Verdery Library received a grant of over $6,000 from U.S. Senator Chris Dodd's office to improve its Internet access through the E-Rate grants.

In 2020, the school narrowed its range of grades from kindergarten through 12 to grades 4 through 12. In 2021, it narrowed to grades 5 through 12.

Notable alumni
Tracy Chapman—folk singer and guitarist
Andrew Stevovich—painter
Cyrus Mehri—trial attorney
Zachary Cole Smith—singer and frontman of DIIV
Neil Rudenstine—president of Harvard University for a decade in the 1990s

References

External links
 

Private high schools in Connecticut
Buildings and structures in Danbury, Connecticut
Schools in Fairfield County, Connecticut
Educational institutions established in 1926
Private middle schools in Connecticut
Private elementary schools in Connecticut
1926 establishments in Connecticut
Episcopal schools in the United States